Avril Lovelace-Johnson is a Ghanaian jurist. She was nominated Supreme Court Judge in November 2019 and vetted on 9 December 2019. She was sworn in on 17 December 2019.

Early life and education
Lovelace-Johnson hails from Mankessim in the Central Region of Ghana. She had her secondary education at Wesley Girls' High School for her ordinary level certificate and Aburi Girls' Senior High School for her advanced level certificate.

Career
Lovelace-Johnson worked as an Assistant State Attorney at the Attorney-General's Department in Accra and the Attorney General's Department in Koforidua after her National Service from 1988 to 1989. She served as a District Magistrate in June 1994 until she was appointed Justice of the High Court at the Accra and the Tema High courts in June 2002. She served on the bench as a High Court judge until 2012 when she became a Justice of the Court of Appeal. She was assigned by the Commonwealth Secretariat in London to The Gambia as a Justice of the High Court also acting as an additional Justice of the Court of Appeal from December 2005 to 2009. She had been a justice of the Court of Appeal until her nomination for the role of Supreme Court Judge in November 2019. She was sworn into office on 17 December 2019.

Lovelace-Johnson has held a number of leadership positions, including serving as Director of the Public Complaints and Courts Inspectorate Unit of the Judicial Service of Ghana and serving as the vice-president of the Association of Magistrates and Judges of Ghana. She was once an honorary council member of the Planned Parenthood Association of Ghana.

See also
List of judges of the Supreme Court of Ghana
Supreme Court of Ghana

References

Date of birth missing (living people)
Living people
Justices of the Supreme Court of Ghana
Ghanaian women judges
20th-century judges
21st-century judges
People educated at Wesley Girls' Senior High School
Alumni of Aburi Girls' Senior High School
University of Ghana alumni
20th-century women judges
21st-century women judges
1961 births